Inchy is a commune in the Nord department in northern France. Jean-Gérard Fleury (1905–2002) French businessman, aviator, journalist and writer was born in Inchy.

Heraldry

See also
Communes of the Nord department

References

Communes of Nord (French department)